Chris Starkjohann (born June 30, 1956) is an American professional golfer who played on the Nationwide Tour and the Champions Tour.

Starkjohann joined the Nationwide Tour in 1993. He only played in two events on the Nationwide Tour between 1994 and 1997 and then rejoined the Tour in 1998. In 1998 he only made two of thirteen cuts but won the Nike St. Louis Golf Classic. He continued to play on the Nationwide Tour until 2005 but didn't play in many events. He joined the Champions Tour in 2006, earning his Tour card through qualifying school. He only played in four events from 2007 to 2008 but rejoined the Tour in 2009 after going through qualifying school for a second time. His highlight on the Champions Tour came in 2009 at the Senior PGA Championship where he finished in a tie for fifth.

Starkjohann was a member of the United States PGA Cup team that defeated Great Britain & Ireland 13½ to 12½ in 2007. He has been named the PGA National Senior Player of the Year three times (2006, 2007 and 2009), Southern California PGA Section Player of the Year six times, Southern California PGA Section Senior Player of the Year twice and the PGA San Diego Chapter Player of the Year five times.

Starkjohann currently works at the Carlsbad Golf Center in Carlsbad, California as in instructor. He worked at the Pala Mesa Golf Club in Fallbrook, California from 1984 to 1993 and has worked at several courses throughout the San Diego area.

Professional wins (10)

Nike Tour wins (1)

Other wins (9)
1991 TPS Championship, Southern California PGA Championship
2002 San Diego County Open
2004 TPS Championship, Southern California PGA Championship
2007 TPS Championship
2009 TPS Championship
2010 Southern California PGA Championship
2012 Southern California PGA Championship

Results in major championships

CUT = missed the half-way cut
Note: Starkjohann only played in the PGA Championship.

U.S. national team appearances
PGA Cup: 2007 (winners)

External links

Profile at the Carlsbad Golf Center official site

American male golfers
PGA Tour golfers
PGA Tour Champions golfers
Golfers from Texas
Sportspeople from Fort Worth, Texas
People from Fallbrook, California
1956 births
Living people